The Talmudical Academy of Central New Jersey (Adelphia) is an Orthodox Jewish yeshiva high school and rabbinical college in Howell Township, New Jersey.

As of the 2013–14 school year, the school had an enrollment of 44 students and 4.0 classroom teachers (on an FTE basis), for a student–teacher ratio of 11.0:1. The school's student body was 100.0% White.

Founded in 1970 by Rabbi Yeruchim Shain in Adelphia, New Jersey, the school was originally a boarding school for high-school-college aged boys from the New York City area. Today the school has students from all over the world. Many of its alumni are teachers, principals and educators in their respective communities.

The Yeshiva has a state-of-the-art gym and a Mikvah (ritual bath) on its  campus.

See also
List of high schools in New Jersey

References

External links
National Center for Education Statistics data for the Talmudical Academy of Central New Jersey

1972 establishments in New Jersey
Educational institutions established in 1972
Howell Township, New Jersey
Jewish day schools in New Jersey
Modern Orthodox Jewish day schools in the United States
Modern Orthodox Judaism in New Jersey
Private high schools in Monmouth County, New Jersey
Universities and colleges in Monmouth County, New Jersey
Orthodox yeshivas in New Jersey